Date A Live is an anime series adapted from the light novels of the same title written by Kōshi Tachibana and illustrated by Tsunako. The first season was produced by Anime International Company and directed by Keitaro Motonaga, covering volumes 1 to 4 of the light novel. It was broadcast on Tokyo MX from April 6 to June 22, 2013. The second season was produced by Production IMS, which ran from April 12 to June 14, 2014, covering volumes 5 to 7 of the light novel. The third season was produced by J.C.Staff, which ran from January 11 to March 29, 2019, covering volumes 8 to 12 of the light novel. The fourth season produced by Geek Toys was set to premiere in October 2021, but was delayed to 2022 for "various reasons", which ran from April 8 to June 24, 2022, covering volumes 13 to 16 of the light novel. A fifth season has been announced.

The series has been licensed by Funimation for streaming and home video release in North America and by Madman Entertainment in Australia. Following Sony's acquisition of Crunchyroll, the series was moved from Funimation to Crunchyroll.


Series overview

Episodes

Season 1 (2013)

Season 2 (2014)

Season 3 (2019)

Season 4 (2022)

OVAs

Notes

References

External links
  
  
  
 English release website from Funimation

 
Lists of anime episodes